Karolina Zmarlak (born October 15, 1982) is a Polish-American fashion designer. She is known for founding the fashion company KZ_K Studio.

Early life and education
Zmarlak was born in Poland. She immigrated to Chicago in 1992 through the Diversity Visa (DV) program. She was inspired to become a clothing designer after taking her first sewing class in high school. Zmarlak attended the Fashion Institute of Technology in New York City. While in college, she was awarded the Gen Art Styles Award for evening wear in 2005.

Career
Zmarlak began her career in the fashion industry by interning at the fashion brands Theory and Carolina Herrera. After graduating from college, she partnered with Jesse Keyes to launch the self-titled fashion label Karolina Zmarlak in 2009. In 2009, Zmarlak launched her first clothing collection, Fluid Foundations, through the stores Takashimaya and Eva. In 2011, she collaborated with Belvedere Vodka on the fashion film Double Identity. In 2013, Zmarlak formed a partnership with Saks Fifth Avenue, which began carrying her clothing collections. In 2014, Zmarlak became one of the first recipients of the New York City Fashion Production Fund.

In 2015, Zmarlak collaborated with costume designer Daniel Lawson to provide costumes for the TV series The Good Wife. In 2015, her Fall ready-to-wear collection was featured in Vogue. In Spring 2015, she also showcased her clothing designs in the fashion film Transience at Video Fashion Week. In September 2015, Zmarlak spoke at an event promoting the development of New York’s fashion industry alongside other speakers such as U.S. Representative Carolyn B. Maloney. In 2016, Zmarlak and Keyes founded a new fashion label, KZ_K Studio. In 2018, Zmarlak served as a critic at the Fashion Institute of Technology's annual fashion show.

In 2022, Zmarlak and Keyes opened a new KZ_K Studio location on Great Jones Street in Manhattan. The Great Jones Street studio officially launched on April 12, 2022.

See also
Jesse Keyes

References

External links
Karolina Zmarlak Official Site

American fashion designers
American women fashion designers
Fashion Institute of Technology
Polish fashion designers
Polish women fashion designers
Fashion stylists
People from Krosno
Polish women in business
Clothing brands of the United States
American women company founders
American company founders
Polish female models
Polish women artists
1982 births
Living people
21st-century American women